Tezuka (手塚, "hand mound" or 手束, "hand bundle") is a Japanese surname. Notable people with the surname include:

, Japanese voice actor
, Japanese actor
, Japanese gravure idol and bikini model
, Japanese film and anime director
, Japanese manga artist
, Japanese tennis player
, former Japanese soccer player
, Japanese video game designer
, Japanese race car driver
Yoshio Tezuka (手塚仁雄, born 1966), Japanese politician

Fictional characters
 of The Prince of Tennis
 of Katawa Shoujo
Beth Tezuka of Bravest Warriors

See also
Tezuka Award
Tezuka Productions
Tezuka Osamu Cultural Prize
3998 Tezuka, main-belt asteroid
Ravex in Tezuka World Japanese 2009 anime short film

Japanese-language surnames